Komeh (also Romanized as Kommeh; also known as Bakhsh-e Kommeh) is a city and capital of Padena District, in Semirom County, Isfahan Province, Iran. At the 2006 census, its population was 2,305, in 551 families.

References

Populated places in Semirom County

Cities in Isfahan Province